Haramija is a Croatian family name. It is derived from a Turkish word for bandit. Haramija was corp of Christian army in 16th century in Croatia (it was part of Habsburg Monarchy). They protected south west border of Habsburg Monarchy from Turkish attacks.

Dragutin Haramija (1923–2012) was Prime Minister of Croatia in 1969–71.

See also 
 Harambašić
 Korun Aramija

References 

Croatian surnames